Youenn Gwernig (10 May 1925 – 29 August 2006; born in Scaër, Douarnenez) was a Breton-American poet, writer and singer. He was a painter, sculptor and a TV presenter on the French channel France 3.

He was born in 1925 in the town of Scaër (Brittany). He moved to the United States in the late 1950s and became an American citizen. He returned to Brittany in the late 60s. Influenced by traditional Breton culture, American pop culture and the Beat Generation he knew through his friendship with Jack Kerouac, he wrote poetry and songs in Breton and English.

Life

He was born in 1925, into a traditional Breton family, in Scaër. He first worked as a wood sculptor. In the early 1950s he met the Breton poet and singer Glenmor, with whom he set a music band called Breizh a gan ("Brittany sings" in Breton language) which was the first cultural Breton band after World War II. This band set an operetta called Genovefa ("Genevieve" in Breton).

He went to the US in 1957 because of the poverty in Brittany as he explained in his song Tap da sac'h 'ta ("Keep your bag so"). From 1961, he regularly visited the West Side neighbourhood of New York City and met the Beat Generation writers there. He became a friend of Jack Kerouac and lived in the Bronx, where he wrote some bilingual poems in Breton and in English about New York or his nostalgy of Brittany in an American big city, as Un dornad plu ("A handful of feathers", 1961) or War ribl ar stêr Harlem ("On the bank of Harlem river", August 1963). In 1968, he wrote a poems' collection called New York City blues in which there are poems about some places in New York and the way he saw them as 125vet straed ("125th street"), Uptown-Downtown or El barrio. In the 1997's Al Liamm edition of Un dornad plu, Youenn Gwernig explained why he used to write his poems in Breton and to translate them in English :

"Meeting with Jack Kerouac in 1965, for instance, was a decisive turn. Since he could not speak Breton he asked me : "Would you not write some of your poems in English, I'd really like to read them !..." So I wrote an Diri Dir - Stairs of Steel for him, and kept on doing so. That's why I often write my poems in Breton, French and English."

He used to send his poems to the Breton library Al Liamm.

He returned to Brittany in 1969 with his wife (Suzig) and his daughters (Annaïg, Gwenola and Marie). He released his first disc in 1971. He released the album Distro ar Gelted ("Come back the Celtic people") in 1974. He became famous with his song E-kreiz an noz ("In the middle of the night")

He wrote a novel in French in 1982, La grande tribu ("The great tribe" in French language), where he described his life in the USA. His poetry was issued in 1972 (An toull en nor) and in 1976 (An diri dir).

In the 1970s, he created the Radio télé Brezhoneg ("Breton language Broadcasting") association which aimed to stand up for the Breton language on TV. He also hosted Breton emissions in the 1990s, with the singer Nolwenn Korbell for instance.

In 1990 his album Emañ ar bed va iliz ("The world is my church") was released. In 2002, a second novel, Appelez-moi ange ("Call me angel" in French Language), was issued. He died in 2006.

Discography 

 1971 : Les bougnoules - Gavotte du joint ("The Arabs - The Joint's dance" in french)
 1973 : Ni hon unan! - Tap da sac'h ("We, ourselves ! - Get your bag" in Breton)
 1974 : Distro ar Gelted ("Come back the Celt people" in Breton), LP Arfolk
 1975 : E-kreiz an noz ("In the middle of the night" in Breton), LP Velia
 1979 : Youenn Gwernig, Private People, LP
 1990 : Emañ ar bed va iliz ("The world is my church" in Breton), CD
 1994 : Foeter Bro / Just a traveller / Compagnon de route, CD
 2003 : Identity, Coop Breizh (Best of)

Books

 An toull en nor (bilingual breton-english, litt. The door's hole), Ar Majenn éditions, 1972.
 An diri dir / Les escaliers d’acier / Stairs of steel (trilingual Breton-French-English), Ar Majenn éditions, 1976.
 La grande tribu, (French, The great Tribe) Grasset,1982.
 Un dornad plu / A handful of feathers (Breton and English), Al Liamm, 1997.
 Appelez-moi Ange (French, Call me angel) ), Blanc Silex, 2002.
 Kerouac city blues with Jacques Josse, Daniel Biga, Alain Jégou...

Notes

Bibliography
 

1925 births
Writers from Brittany
Poets from Brittany
2006 deaths
People from Finistère
American people of Breton descent
Breton-language singers
French male poets
20th-century French poets
20th-century French male singers
20th-century French male writers
French emigrants to the United States